Dong Huibo (born February 15, 1989, in Changchun, Jilin) is a Chinese former competitive pair skater. With partner Wu Yiming, she is the 2008 World Junior bronze medalist. She previously competed as a single skater on the national level.

Results

References
 2008 Junior Worlds Pairs Results

External links

 

1989 births
Living people
Chinese female pair skaters
Figure skaters from Changchun
World Junior Figure Skating Championships medalists
Universiade medalists in figure skating
Universiade silver medalists for China
Universiade bronze medalists for China
Competitors at the 2009 Winter Universiade
Competitors at the 2011 Winter Universiade